John Alastair Haggie is a Canadian politician, who was elected to the Newfoundland and Labrador House of Assembly in the 2015 provincial election. He represents the electoral district of Gander as a member of the Liberal Party.

Early life 
Haggie was born to a mother whose maiden surname was Wilson in Manchester, England, in March 1954. His father died when he was at a very young age, and his mother's younger brother Glyn helped raise him. Haggie was educated at William Hulme's Grammar School, after which he completed his medical education at Victoria University of Manchester in 1977. He trained in general surgery in the North West Region, culminating in earning his Fellowship in 1981. Subsequently, after a two-year fellowship at the Christie Hospital and Paterson Institute for Cancer Research, he received a doctorate in cancer research in 1987.

Move to Newfoundland and career 
After working as a surgeon, tutor, and a lecturer at universities in Manchester and Liverpool, Haggie immigrated to Newfoundland and Labrador in 1993. He practiced as a general surgeon with the Grenfell Region Health Services in St. Anthony until 1997, when he relocated his practice to the James Paton Memorial Hospital in Gander. He also served as president of the Canadian Medical Association from 2011 to 2012.

Haggie was appointed to cabinet in the Ball government as Minister of Health and Community Services on December 14, 2015. He was re-elected in the 2019 provincial election. On August 19, 2020 Haggie was reappointed Minister of Health and Community Services in the Furey government. He is the longest serving NL Minister of Health and Community Services in thirty six years.

Haggie was re-elected in the 2021 provincial election. Following the election, he was reappointed Minister of Health and Community Services. On July 6, 2022, Haggie was appointed Minister of Education.

Personal life 
Haggie had three children with his first wife, Jane Elizabeth (nee Wilson) - Hollie, Jennifer, and Elizabeth. Jane died at age 52 on May 25, 2005 in Gander. He is currently married to Jeannette Augot, a registered nurse employed by the Central Health Regional Medical Authority.

His favorite book is Shōgun by James Clavell. He also holds an interest in competitive handgun shooting, having tried out to become a squad member of the Welsh national team prior to immigrating to Canada.

On January 1, 2022, Haggie announced on his Facebook page that he tested positive for COVID-19.

References

Living people
Liberal Party of Newfoundland and Labrador MHAs
Members of the Executive Council of Newfoundland and Labrador
Canadian surgeons
Health ministers of Newfoundland and Labrador
21st-century Canadian politicians
People educated at William Hulme's Grammar School
1954 births